The Black Ark was the recording studio of reggae and dub producer Lee "Scratch" Perry, built in 1973 and located behind his family's home in the Washington Gardens neighborhood of Kingston, Jamaica. Despite the rudimentary set-up and dated equipment, it was nonetheless the breeding ground for some of Jamaica's most innovative sounds and recording techniques in the latter half of the 1970s.

Innovative musical techniques

From a technological standpoint, the Black Ark was at the low end in comparison to the international music recording standards of its day. The studio's legendary reputation stems from the innovative production techniques employed by Perry to create sounds that baffled his contemporaries, and which have continued to be a source of amazement to later generations of music producers. An example of Perry's inventive style was his ability to overdub layers of sound effects and instrumentation on each recording track of a basic 4-track machine, with such precise timing and in such a way that the resulting sound would destroy the competition from Jamaica's other top producers using the latest 16-track mixing consoles. Perry once buried microphones at the base of a palm tree and thumped it rhythmically to produce a mystifying bass drum effect and his drum booth at the Black Ark was for a time surrounded with chicken wire to further his distinctive sound. Many of his songs are layered with a variety of subtle effects created from broken glass, ghastly sighs and screeches, crying babies, falling rain and cow noises. While it was thought to believe that Perry recorded the "mooing" noises from actual cows, it was actually the baritone voice of Watty Burnett through a tin foil laced cardboard tube that produced the cow-like noises. These and other notable recording techniques helped define the Black Ark sound, as well as Lee Perry's creative legacy.

Perry was known for his eccentric and superstitious behavior during production sessions. He would often "bless" his recording equipment with mystical invocations, blow ganja smoke onto his tapes while recording, bury unprotected tapes in the soil outside of his studio, and surround himself with burning candles and incense, whose wax and dust remnants were allowed to infest his electronic recording equipment. He would also spray tapes with a variety of fluids, including urine, blood and whisky, ostensibly to enhance their spiritual properties. Later commentators have drawn a direct relationship between the decay of Perry's facility and the unique sounds he was able to create from his studio equipment.

Perry has described his relationship to the studio thus:

Musicians and the Black Ark

Artists who were produced and/or recorded at the Black Ark include Bob Marley, Junior Byles, The Congos, Junior Murvin, Max Romeo, Mighty Diamonds, The Heptones, Augustus Pablo and Jah Lion. Paul Douglas mentions, "Scratch had a particular sound and everybody was fascinated by his sound.  He had this way of putting things together; it was just his sound and it influenced a lot of people.  I’ve even gone to the Black Ark with Eric Gale for that Negril album; I remember myself and Val Douglas, we laid some tracks there, Eric Gale overdubbed stuff on there, but I honestly don’t remember what happened to it." Lee Perry and his studio were also formative in creating the highly innovative reggae subgenre called dub, in which the producer/engineer becomes the focus of the music, manipulating a pre-recorded track and creating something entirely new using the mixing console as nothing less than an instrument. Perry worked with The Clash and Paul McCartney and his band Wings had recorded there between 1972 and 1979.

The end
In 1979, following years of increasingly bizarre and erratic behavior, Lee "Scratch" Perry, armed with a magic marker, covered every available surface of the Black Ark with impenetrable writings before allegedly burning it to the ground.  This event, with the loss of the studio's unique sound and a hiatus in Perry's extraordinary creative skills, effectively ended an era during which much of Jamaica's most innovative sounds had captured the world of music. However, it has been related by several Perry family members that the studio in fact caught fire in 1983 after an ill-fated attempt to rebuild it, the result of an electrical accident. More often than not, Perry has claimed that he personally destroyed the Black Ark due to "unclean spirits" - an allusion to some of the undesirable people who were constantly at the Black Ark in later years. There are also stories that Perry was being blackmailed by gangsters who wanted a cut of the record profits. Perry himself stated in an interview with clashmusic.com regarding the fire, "Too much stress in Jamaica, all the time. Everybody want money, everybody want paid. Everyone got problem and want me to solve their problem. Nobody gave me anything, people just took everything. Everybody take this, and take that. So the atmosphere in the Black Ark studio was changing; it wasn’t like it used to be. Then I decided to make a sacrifice as the energy wasn’t good anymore." Shortly thereafter, he moved to London and then Switzerland.

Films

2011 - The Upsetter: The Life and Music of Lee Scratch Perry. Directed by Ethan Higbee and Adam Bhala Lough.

Notes

References

Reggae
Recording studios in Jamaica
Buildings and structures in Kingston, Jamaica